Viva Wallet' is a European Neobank entirely based in Microsoft Azure with presence in 24 European countries. Viva Wallet Holdings owns a Banking License (VIVABANK SA). In January 2022, international media reported that Viva Wallet was the first Greek unicorn startup company after an agreement with JP Morgan Chase was announced. Viva Wallet is part of the Viva Wallet Group, consisting of the subsidiaries Viva Services SA, Viva Payment Services and Vivabank.

History

In 2000, Haris Karonis founded Realize SA in Athens, Greece, which initially operated as a software house. In 2006, Viva Services was founded and entered the voice over IP business and later travel services, followed in 2010 by an expansion to the e-ticketing market. In 2011, Haris Karonis and Makis Antypas founded Viva Payments, which is licensed as a payment institution for the European Economic Area, following the transposition of the PSD2 in the Greek institutional framework.

Three years later, in 2014, the company obtained an Electronic Money Association License and announced the completion of its Series A round funding round, led by the Latsis family office.

In 2020, Viva Wallet expanded its services to 23 European countries. On August 3 of the same year, the company announced the acquisition of the banking license of Praxia Bank.

In 2021, Viva Wallet announced the completion of its Series D funding round, led by Tencent, the European Bank for Reconstruction and Development (EBRD), as well as Jim Breyer’s Breyer Capital.

Investment from JP Morgan 
On 25 January 2022, JPMorgan Chase announced that it was to buy a 48.5% stake in Viva Wallet Holdings Software Development S.A. After the agreement with JP Morgan, international media reported that Viva Wallet was the first Greek ''unicorn startup."

Founders 
Haris Karonis was born in 1974 in Athens, Greece. He is currently the CEO and Co-founder of Viva Wallet.

Makis Antypas was born in Athens, Greece, in 1976. He’s the Co-founder and CIO of Viva Wallet and is currently serving as the CEO of Vivabank.

Viva Wallet's subsidiaries

Viva Services 
Viva Services is a provider of online services in Greece. 

It is an online travel agency, a KO telecommunications provider licensed by the Hellenic Telecommunications and Post Commission and a registered insurance agent. The company is a subsidiary of Viva Wallet Holdings SA (formerly Realize SA).

Vivabank 
On August 3rd, 2020, Viva Wallet announced the acquisition of the banking license of Praxia Bank, opening the way for the creation of Vivabank. Vivabank is a credit institution licensed and supervised by the Bank of Greece.

References

External links
  
 Realize website 

Telecommunications companies of Greece
Online travel agencies
Companies based in Athens
Greek brands
Software companies of Greece